English rapper Dizzee Rascal has released seven studio albums, one live album, one extended play, 32 singles (including nine singles as a featured artist), two charity releases, two promotional singles and two mixtapes.

Dizzee Rascal released his debut studio album, Boy in da Corner, on 21 July 2003, in the United Kingdom, where it peaked at number twenty-three; having been certified as gold by the British Phonographic Industry (BPI). The album was preceded by the rapper's debut single, "I Luv U", which peaked at number twenty-nine on the UK Singles Chart. The singles "Fix Up, Look Sharp" and "Jus' a Rascal" were also released from the album in 2003, reaching peaks of number seventeen and thirty, respectively, in the UK. The rapper's second studio album, Showtime was released on 6 September 2004, where it debuted at number eight in the UK and number sixty-five in Ireland. The album's lead single, "Stand Up Tall" was released on 23 August 2004, marking Dizzee Rascal's first top-ten single when it peaked at number ten. The album also saw the release of "Dream" and the double A-side "Off 2 Work"/"Graftin'", which reached peaks of number fourteen and number forty-four in the UK, respectively.

A third studio album, Maths + English, was released on 4 June 2007, where it debuted at number seven in the UK and number fifty-seven in Ireland. The album saw the release of three singles, "Sirens", "Pussyole (Old Skool)" and "Flex", which reached peaks of number twenty, twenty-two and twenty-three, respectively, in the UK. On 22 June 2008, Dizzee Rascal released "Dance wiv Me", a collaboration with singer Chrome and songwriter/producer Calvin Harris. The track saw commercial success for the rapper when it debuted at number-one in the UK, also reaching number five in Ireland and number thirteen in Australia. The single spent four consecutive weeks at the top of the UK chart and was certified platinum the following year for surpassing sales of 600,000 copies. The rapper continued the line of success when follow-up singles "Bonkers", produced by Armand van Helden, and "Holiday", featuring Chrome, both topped the UK chart. The fourth studio album, Tongue N' Cheek, was released on 21 September 2009, peaking at number three in the UK and number twenty in Ireland. It was succeeded by the release of a fourth single, "Dirtee Cash", which gave the rapper a fourth consecutive top-ten hit when it peaked at number ten.

At the 2010 BRIT Awards, Dizzee collaborated with British indie rock band Florence and the Machine, performing "You Got the Dirtee Love", a mash-up of "You've Got the Love" and "Dirtee Cash". The collaboration was then released as a digital download, peaking at number two in the United Kingdom and number twenty-four in Ireland. The album, Tongue N' Cheek, was re-issued in June 2010 to include the collaboration and celebrate the platinum certification of the album itself. The 'Dirtee Deluxe' edition of the album included the single "Dirtee Disco", which gave the rapper a fourth solo number-one single when it topped the chart in May 2010.

The rapper returned to the charts in 2012 following the release of "Scream", which featured Must Be the Music finalist Pepper (of Pepper & Piano). It became the artist's nineteenth top forty hit in the United Kingdom when it debuted at number twenty-two in August 2012.

Dizzee Rascal has also appeared as a featured artist on several occasions, the first of which was "Lucky Star" (2003), a collaboration with Basement Jaxx that peaked at number twenty-three in the UK. The rapper has also collaborated with The Brighton Port Authority on the track "Toe Jam" (2008) and with D Double E on the track "Bluku! Bluku!" (2011). Most notably is Dizzee Rascal's collaboration with Colombian singer Shakira, "Loca". The track proved an international hit, topping charts worldwide, including Poland, Portugal and Spain; also peaking at number thirty-two on the Billboard Hot 100. In 2010, the rapper collaborated with British producer DJ Fresh on the track "The Power"—which peaked at number six in the United Kingdom. The rapper has also been involved in two charity releases: firstly as Band Aid 20 in 2004 on the track "Do They Know It's Christmas" and secondly as part of Shout for England in 2010 on the track "Shout" with James Corden, both peaking at number one in the UK and Ireland.

Albums

Studio albums

Live albums

Mixtapes

Extended plays

Singles

As lead artist

As featured artist

Charity releases

Promotional singles

Other charted songs

Guest appearances

In video games
In PlayStation Home, the PlayStation 3's online community-based service, there was an event dedicated for Dizzee Rascal in the VIP Room of the SingStar themed game space that ran from 24 September 2009 to 9 October 2009. Dizzee performed for the PS Home/SingStar community and answered questions for an hour after the performance. There were also limited time items at this space like a Dizzee Mask. This was available to the European and North American versions of PlayStation Home, however, Dizzee only appeared in the European version answering questions. There is also a SongPack on the SingStore for SingStar that include six of Dizzee's tracks.

Dizzee's track "Stand Up Tall" is featured in the 2005 video game FIFA Street.

"Fix Up, Look Sharp" is featured in the 2009 video game DJ Hero and in the United Kingdom version of the 2010 video game Def Jam Rapstar.

"Bonkers" is featured in the 2009 video game Need for Speed: Nitro, the 2010 video game DJ Hero 2 and the 2012 video game Need For Speed: Most Wanted.

"Heart of a Warrior" is featured in the 2014 game WWE 2K15

Notes

References

Discographies of British artists
Hip hop discographies